Echthistatus is a genus of longhorn beetles of the subfamily Lamiinae, containing the following species:

 Echthistatus hawksi (Giesbert, 2001)
 Echthistatus spinulosus Pascoe, 1862

References

Parmenini